The following is a list of notable Microsoft Visual Studio Add-ins.  Add-ins are software products designed to be used in conjunction with and extend Microsoft Visual Studio.  There are many versions of Microsoft Visual Studio, so some of these products may not be compatible with all versions of the product.  Managed add-ins are typically found in the following location on Windows Vista and higher: C:\Users\{username}\Documents\Visual Studio {version}\Addins.  COM-based add-ins can be installed anywhere as their directories are specified via the registry.

IDE add-ins

Source control support
AnkhSVN – Provides a free Subversion client for Visual Studio
VisualSVN - Subversion integration for Visual Studio 2003/2005/2008/2010/2012/2013/2015/2017
VsTortoise - A free TortoiseSVN add-in for Microsoft Visual Studio 2008/2010/2012/2013

Refactoring and productivity
CodeRush -  Refactoring and productivity plugin
Visual Assist X - Productivity plugin, like Resharper. Notable for C++ support

Other
PVS-Studio - Static Code Analyzer for C#,C,C++,C++11,C++/CX. Supports Visual Studio 2005/2008/2010/2012/2013/2015/2017.
Designbox - Adds a toolbox that lets you associate initial property values with controls
Koders – Adds a search plug-in to search the Koders database
Reflector - a code browsing utility
Dotfuscator – Provides tools to help prevent reverse engineering
VSdocman - Visual Studio code commenter (XML doc comments) and API documentation generator. For VS 2010/2008/2005/2003/2002.
XMLSpy – Integrates the XMLSpy IDE into Visual Studio for editing XML, XSLT, XSD, XQuery, XBRL, OOXML, etc.
Liquid XML Studio – Integrates Liquid XML Tools: XML Schema Editor, WSDL Editor, XPath Expression Builder, and Web Services Test Client into Visual Studio 2005/2008/2010
 AWS Toolkit for Visual Studio Code

Language add-ins

Ada programming language
ActionScript 3, for building Flash applications
Boo programming language
Eiffel programming language
F# programming language
Oxygene programming language
Python Tools for Visual Studio
PHP Tools for Visual Studio

References

Microsoft Visual Studio
Visual Studio Add-ins